is a mountain in the Northwest Highlands of Scotland. It lies in the Fannichs of Wester Ross. It is a Munro with a height of 

The most westerly of the Fannichs, it offers superb views of the Fisherfield Forest and An Teallach from its summit. It is usually climbed in conjunction with  Sgurr Breac. The nearest village is Kinlochewe to the southwest.

References

Mountains and hills of the Northwest Highlands
Marilyns of Scotland
Munros